Snow Creek, also known as Snow Creek Village, is a small unincorporated community in Riverside County, California. It is located roughly northwest of Palm Springs, on the western edge of the Santa Rosa and San Jacinto Mountains National Monument, and roughly southeast of the San Gorgonio Pass. It is named after nearby Snow Creek.

The community consists of less than 40 dwellings, with a single 2-mile road connecting it to California State Route 111.

References

External links 
 http://friendsofpalmspringsmountains.org/snowcreek.html
 http://www.desertsun.com/story/news/environment/2014/09/20/snow-creek-desert-water-agency/15990019

Unincorporated communities in Riverside County, California
Unincorporated communities in California
San Gorgonio Pass